Aladdin Theater is a theater in the Brooklyn neighborhood of southeast Portland, Oregon. It originally opened as a vaudeville house called Geller's Theatre on December 25  (Christmas Day), 1927. Its name was changed to Aladdin in 1934. Later the venue operated as a pornographic cinema for more than 30 years, screening the film Deep Throat for fourteen of them. It was revived as a classic movie and live music venue with a capacity of 620 in 1991.

References

External links 
Aladdin Theater

1927 establishments in Oregon
Brooklyn, Portland, Oregon
Music venues in Portland, Oregon
Theatres completed in 1927
Theatres in Portland, Oregon
Adult movie theaters